Beth Wiseman may refer to:
Beth Wiseman (composer), British composer, specializing in multimedia
Beth Wiseman (author), American writer from Texas